Twice is a studio album by the singer Hollie Cook. It was released on May 12, 2014, through Mr Bongo Records.

Critical reception
AllMusic wrote that the album "follows in the same path as [Cook's] debut, featuring nine tracks dominated by Cook's smooth, slyly sexy voice and arrangements that keep the grooves light but dance-friendly at once."

Track listing

Personnel
According to the booklet.

Musicians
 Adriano Adewale - percussion
 Alfred Bannerman - guitars
 Anselmo Netto - percussion
 Barthélémy Corbelet - synthesizer, Clavinet, string arrangements
 Black Steel - bass, guitars, organ, piano
 Bubblers - organ piano
 Catriona Cannon - Irish harp
 Cyrus "Monkites" Richard - organ, piano
 Dennis Bovell - backing vocals
 Dub Judah - bass
 George Dekker - backing vocals
 Winston "Horseman" Williams - drums, percussion
 Jahmel Ellison - bass
 Kashta Tafari - guitars
 K.V. BALAKRISHNAN - tabla
 Lenny Edwards - percussion
 Leroy Horns - saxophone
 Marlon Roudette - steel pan
 Omar Lye Fook - synthesizer, Clavinet
 Prince Fatty - percussion
 Winston Francis - backing vocals
 Yohan - string arrangements

Recording
 Boban Apostolov - Protools engineer
 Evtim Ristov - stage manager
 Georgii Hristovski - sound engineer
 Oleg Kontradenko - conductor
 Riste Trajkovski - stage manager
 Yoann Le Dantec - arrangements; orchestration
F.A.M.E.'S. Project - Macedonian Radio
Symphonic Orchestra and Choir - Skopje, Macedonia

Charts

Twice peaked at position 6 on Billboard Reggae Albums chart and stayed on the chart for 11 weeks.

References

2014 albums